Tampico Alto is one of the 212 municipalities of the Mexican state of Veracruz. It is located in the state's Huasteca Alta region, at the northern end of Tamiahua Lagoon. The municipal seat is also called Tampico Alto.

In the 2005 INEGI Census, the municipality reported a total population of 11,971 (down from 14,684 in 1980), of whom 2,126 lived in the municipal seat. 
Of the municipality's inhabitants, 129 spoke an indigenous language, primarily Wastek (Huasteco).

Tampico Alto Municipality covers a total surface area of 1,027.35 km2.

Settlements in the municipality
Tampico Alto (municipal seat; 2005 population 2,126)
Brecha Huasteca (population 3,000) 
La Ribera (2,500) 
Llano de Bustos (2,000)
Las Chacas (519)

References

External links
Tampico Alto  Web page of the Veracruz State Govt. Accessed 6 November 2008.

Municipalities of Veracruz